"Je te veux" ("I Want You") is a song composed by Erik Satie to a text by Henry Pacory. The text consists of two verses and a repeated chorus.

In 1925, the song was recorded with Yvonne George as singer. Other notable singers who performed the song include Mathé Altéry, Régine Crespin, Nicolai Gedda, and later Jessye Norman, Marie Devellereau, and Angela Gheorghiu. Jazz vocalist Cécile McLorin Salvant performed the song on Jacky Terrasson's 2012 album Gouache. John Cage instructs the performer to do the piano and voice version as part of his nine short songs, "Sonnekus²" (1985).

The song was registered with SACEM on 20 November 1902, but Alexis Roland-Manuel argued it had actually been composed in 1897. Satie composed various versions of the "Je te veux" waltz: for piano and voice, for an orchestra of brass instruments, and for full orchestra (including a trio). The piano and voice version was first published in 1903. The composer later arranged the work for solo piano, adding a middle section between the second chorus and the second verse.

Lyrics

References

External links 

, Juliette (voice), Alexandre Tharaud (piano)

Compositions by Erik Satie
Waltzes
Mélodies
1903 songs